The Vijay Award for Favourite film is given by STAR Vijay as part of its annual Vijay Awards ceremony for Tamil  (Kollywood) films. In the first year of the awards, the all-time favourite film was chosen by viewers from any particular year, with the 1992 film Devar Magan emerging the winner. From 2007 onwards, viewers were asked to select their favourite film of the respective preceding year.

Winners and nominees
Here is a list of the winners and nominations and the films for which they won and were nominated respectively.

 2007 Pokkiri - S. Ramesh Babu
Billa - L.Suresh
Mozhi - Prakash Raj 
Paruthiveeran - K. E. Gnanavelraja
Sivaji - M. S. Guhan
2008 Vaaranam Aayiram - Aascar films
Aegan - Ayngaran International 
Dasavathaaram - Aascar films 
Kuruvi - Red Giant Movies
Subramaniyapuram - Company Productions
2009 Ayan - AVM Productions
Aadhavan - Red Giant Movies 
Kanthaswamy - Kalaipuli International
Naadodigal - Global Infotainment
Vettaikaaran - AVM Productions
2010 Endhiran - Sun Pictures
Singam - Studio Green
Vinnaithaandi Varuvaayaa - Escape Artists Motion Pictures
Aayirathil Oruvan - Dream Valley Corporation
Boss Engira Bhaskaran - Vasan Visual Ventures
2011 Ko - Elred Kumar
Mankatha - Dayanidhi Azhagiri
Siruthai - K. E. Gnanavel Raja
Velayudham - Aascar films 
7aum Arivu -Red Giant Movies
2012 Thuppakki - Kalaipuli Films International
Nanban - Gemini Film Circuit
Oru Kal Oru Kannadi - Red Giant movies
Naan Ee - Suresh Productions 
Sundarapandian -Company Productions
2013 Thalaivaa - Sri Mishri Productions
Singam 2 - S. Lakshman Kumar
Vishwaroopam - Kamal Haasan
Raja Rani - AR Murugadoss
Varuthapadatha Valibar Sangam - P. Madhan
2014 Kaththi - Lyca Productions
Aranmanai - Sri Thenandal Films
Goli Soda - Bharath Seeni
Veeram - Vijaya Productions 
Velaiyilla Pattathari - Wunderbar Films
2017 Mersal (film) - Sri Thenandal Films

See also
 Tamil cinema
 Cinema of India

References

Favorite Film